The Simmonds Spartan is a 1920s British two-seat biplane trainer/tourer aircraft built by Simmonds Aircraft Limited.

History
Not happy with the high cost of manufacturing light aircraft, O.E. Simmonds designed and built a wooden two-seat biplane in 1928. To reduce maintenance costs all four wings and ailerons were the same; this allowed one spare wing to be used in any position. Powered by a Cirrus III, the prototype G-EBYU first flew in time to enter the King's Cup Air Race of 1928. The aircraft was flown to the Berlin Aero Show on 24 October 1928, a non-stop flight of 7 hours and 10 minutes.

Production began at Woolston, Hampshire, with the final assembly and test flying at Hamble Aerodrome. Forty-nine aircraft were built, many for export, with New Zealand customers buying the most. At home 12 were delivered to the National Flying Services for use as trainers. Three aircraft were operated on floats in Fiji. Although not as famous as other aircraft of the period, one aircraft was ski-equipped and was notable for covering more than 45,000 miles over Norwegian mountain ranges. Three aircraft were built as three-seaters, with two passengers in tandem in front of the pilot; these were mainly used for pleasure flying.

Due to the success of the Spartan, the company renamed itself Spartan Aircraft Limited and developed the design into the two-seater Spartan Arrow and the three-seater Spartan Three Seater.

Survivors   New Zealand  Simmons Spartan ZK-ABZ is situated at the Geraldine Tractor and Automobile Museum.  It was flown by Geraldine based New Zealand Airways Limited, amongst others.

Operators
The aircraft was operated by flying clubs and private individuals:

 

 Fiji Airways

 New Zealand Airways

 South African Air Force

 National Flying Services

Specifications

See also

References

External links

Simmonds/ Spartan Aircraft

1920s British civil utility aircraft
1920s British civil trainer aircraft
1920s British sport aircraft
Spartan Aircraft Ltd aircraft
Biplanes
Single-engined tractor aircraft
Aircraft first flown in 1928